The Type 97 90 mm infantry mortar was a simplified version of the Japanese Type 94 90 mm Infantry Mortar. The Type 97 designation was given to this gun as it was accepted in the year 2597 of the Japanese calendar (1937).

Design
The Type 90-mm mortar was a Stokes-Brandt type mortar similar in appearance to the US 81-mm mortar, M1 and the Japanese Type 97 81 mm piece. It is believed that the 90 mm weapon has been introduced later than its model number would imply, as a captured specimen was marked "Model 97 light trench mortar, manufactured in 1942, Osaka Army Arsenal".

The Type 97 is approximately  lighter than the Type 94 90 mm mortar. The bipod assembly of the Type 97 is  lighter than that on the Type 94. There is a cover for the level on the yoke of the Type 97 which is not on the Type 94, and the sliding bracket of the Type 97 is hinged to permit its easy removal from the leg of the bipod, whereas it is integral on the Type 94. Certain compromises in material and workmanship were made in the manufacture of the Type 97. The bipod feet and chain hooks were held to the legs of the bipod by pins, joined with solder, whereas on the Type 94 they are welded. No welds were polished on the Type 97, although no indications of fractures were reported despite the poor quality of the welding. The adjusting nut, sliding bracket, and hand wheels of the Type 97 are made of steel, rather than brass which was utilized in the Type 94.

References

Notes

Bibliography

External links
http://www3.plala.or.jp/takihome/mortar.htm#97-90

World War II infantry weapons of Japan
Infantry mortars of Japan
90 mm artillery
9
Military equipment introduced in the 1930s